Ust-Kiran is a rural locality (a selo) in Kyakhtinsky District, Republic of Buryatia, Russia. The population was 1,100 as of 2010. There are 13 streets.

Geography 
Ust-Kiran is located 35 km northeast of Kyakhta (the district's administrative centre) by road. Khilgantuy is the nearest rural locality.

References 

Rural localities in Kyakhtinsky District